Special Forces of Zimbabwe are the units of the Zimbabwe National Army that operate as special forces. These forces have been deployed in several African conflicts, including the Mozambique Civil War and the Second Congo War.

Antecedents
In 1980 Prime Minister Robert Mugabe declared integration of Rhodesian Army, which at independence was the existing army, with the two guerilla armies: Zimbabwe African National Liberation Army (ZANLA) and Zimbabwe People's Revolutionary Army (ZIPRA). This meant Rhodesian Special forces were quickly disbanded and refounded. The Selous Scouts were disbanded and became the 1 Parachute Regiment. 1 Commando Brigade was created based on the Rhodesian Light Infantry and Rhodesian African Rifles. British advisors refounded the Special Air Service. Special Forces selection and training were taken from the ones used by Rhodesian army Special forces.

The first operation of the new Special Forces lasted from December 5 to 9 in 1984. Operation Lemon comprised elements of 3 Brigade, the Parachute Group and Special Air Service. Special Forces were deployed to Mozambique to protect the Beira Corridor railway link between Zimbabwe and the port of Beira.

Composition
According to Jane's Special Forces Recognition Guide, Special Forces in the Zimbabwe National Army include:

 One Commando Regiment (formerly One Commando Battalion, previously the Rhodesian Light Infantry), based at Cranborne Barracks, Harare. The commando regiment is the Zimbabwe National Army's lethal and premier special operations light infantry unit. It is capable, flexible and very agile to solve complex military problems beyond the competence of the general duty soldier. It is trained primarily as a special missions unit to conduct direct action raids and assaults in very adverse or sensitive situations. It is trained to be highly mobile and fight independently in the battlefield, with some of its primary roles being to skirmish ahead of the main army force to ambush enemy whilst en route to the battlefield and/or, to harass, disturb, demoralise and prevent the enemy from properly moulding up for combat. Other missions include siege breaking, traditional direct action commando hit and run raids, enemy camp/target seizures and destruction. [ The commando regiment is led by Lieutenant Colonel Hwami Vengesai. Selection phase include a four-day navigating day and night in the Zambezi Valley while carrying a 30 kg weight on an empty stomach. Selection course runs for 21 days starting at the regiment and completed by a final 120km 48 hour navigation to wafa wafa training grounds in Kariba from a selected point. https://www.herald.co.zw/the-making-of-a-commando/. Further training curriculum includes river crossing, mountain climbing, reconnaissance, anti-hijacking, sniping, unarmed combat, tracking and bush craft. Also included is jungle survival on wild fruits and natural remedies for medical treatment. The training curriculum and professional standards are strenuous that those who complete it are highly respected in the ZNA.  Upon completion of selection and training, the soldiers earn the right to wear the distinguishing features of the commando regiment and identify themselves as Commandos. Their operators wear the Tartan Green beret and stable belt, the Commando dagger patch on the side of the chest, and the shoulder tabs engraved commando and special forces. The training course is designed to select, sharpen and create soldiers in character that are unique in some ways from other regular soldiers. Their character profile is found with it men of courage, discipline, fearlessness, above average motivation, supreme aggression, that they are the deadliest and the best of the best, physically very fit and agile, that nobody is better than them, that once engaged in battle they will never run away from the enemy or surrender, that where regular troops have failed is where their job starts, that they are the cream of the ZNA. Their motto is "No mission is impossible until one drops dead". This unit works closely with the SAS with its elite commando Diamond Squadron company being manned by some tiny cadre of secret SAS personnel as undercover/pseudo operators. Together with the SAS and Parachute Regiment, they form the "GI Joe's" of the ZNA. From their involvement in the Second Congo War, this unit performed to the highest professional standards earning itself a fearsome and respected reputation as a very fine special fighting unit. In conventional warfare, generally this unit traditionally experiences more extended hardcore military violence than the SAS who conversely perform highly sensitive, very difficult and precision missions. It is differentiated from the SAS in that the SAS is more a specialist covert long range field intelligence gathering and infiltration special operations regiment whose tasks are beyond the capabilities of either the commando or Parachute regiments. Further, SAS operates with very small teams to conduct protracted, very complex and challenging small team operations, involving high level precise military skills for precision surgical operations, often in very remote areas, with little tactical level support whilst the commandos generally operate in larger commando units to conduct conventional commando raids and assaults.
 One Parachute Regiment (sometimes referred to as Parachute Group) at Andre' Rabie Barracks just north of Harare. The Regiment was originally reconstituted from the Selous Scouts Regiment. The Regiment is led by Lieutenant Colonel Charles Mazaiwana. The Parachute regiment is an elite, cutting edge, airborne Infantry regiment of the Zimbabwe National Army. It was a unit formed by the British Military Advisory Training Team (BMAT) after independence of the country in 1980 and is not an inherited unit from the Rhodesian army . The regiment's distinguishing colors and features are generally the same as the British army's Parachute regiment which encompass the Maroon beret and stable belt, para wings and other inherent features of the unit, only separated by the Zimbabwe bird rather than the British crown. This shows the British Army's input in the creation and operational doctrine of the Parachute regiment.  Members of the Parachute regiment are renowned for carving out a reputation for professionalism, resilience, courage, endurance, aggression and supreme physical fitness. The selection and training of paratroopers is an exacting process and in many ways similar in principle to that of the commandos but differs in doctrine to produce a very special type of a soldier the regiment wants. They are trained to conduct diverse  missions, from conventional prevention and pre-emptive duties, to complex, high amplitude war fighting. The Paratroopers train to a very rigorous standard and form the cutting edge of the ZNA's strategy of rapid intervention. They are also skilled to provide the capability to deploy at very short notice, by air, universally.  They are professional, resilient, brave and self-reliant. A professional rivalry between the Parachute and Commando regiments as to who is the best between these two elite special forces regiments exists. Close professional relations  exist between the Parachute and Special Air Service  regiments. Some key leaders and the nucleus of the Parachute regiment in some areas are actually secret special air service regiment members. In the year 2021 the commando, Parachute and special air service regiments have been deployed to Mozambique as part of a task force to Counter the insurgency and terrorism https://www.defenceweb.co.za/joint/diplomacy-a-peace/zimbabwe-sending-troops-to-mozambique/
https://www.voazimbabwe.com/a/zimbabwe-deploys-300-soldiers-to-train-mozambican-soldiers-islamic-state/5983444.html
https://www.news24.com/citypress/news/zimbabwe-secretly-deploys-combat-personnel-to-help-mozambique-fend-off-insurgents-20210418

 Combat Diving Unit. Special Boat Squadron based in Nyami Nyami Kariba.

 Special Air Service - It is revered as the premier,most highly trained and finest special forces unit of the Zimbabwe Defence Forces. Selection and training are the most extensive, and toughest of any course ZNA has to offer. It is designed to select men with the requisite character and profile capable to serve as SAS soldiers.Zim SAS operators are trained to solve and conduct the most complex special operations missions far beyond the proficiency or capability of any other unit of the Zimbabwe security forces, including those of the famed commando and Parachute regiments shaming the same. The Zim SAS being a special task force are trained first and foremost as a deep reconnaissance field intelligence-gathering unit behind enemy lines to obtain both tactical and strategic intelligence.They are trained to operate as universal soldiers. 

Once based at Kabrit Barracks, adjacent to Harare Airport and at Inkomo barracks under the command of Colonel Panga Kufa. The SAS never allowed women to be recruited into the unit. In principle it is the equivalent of US army's Delta Force, UK 22 SAS regiment and Sayeret Matkal of the Israeli army. It is directly modelled after the British Special Air Service Regiment. Members of the Unit wear the sandy/beige beret with the flaming dagger imprinted their motto: "Who Dares Wins" like their commonwealth counterparts in general. Once SAS candidates pass the designated selection and training courses, they earn the right to be called SAS operatives thus wearing the units distinguishing features. They then move on to their respective squadrons. Within these squadrons are different troops like Air, Mobility, Boat and Mountain troop. The Zimbabwe SAS beret, blue stable belt and other distinguishing features are generally the same as those of UK 22 SAS regiment showing their parentage and historical deep close links that once existed between the units. Members of the unit do not wear their uniform or distinguishing features publicly even during other army programs but rather wear those of other units outside their premises to enforce secrecy. All SAS operatives are trained in Counter Terrorism. The SAS also maintains close relations with the Military Intelligence Directorate as well as reports directly to the head of state. Selection and training are continuous while serving in this unit. This unit also has close links to the Zimbabwe Parachute Regiment as does the UK SAS and its Parachute regiment. Most volunteers who make up the SAS have generally an airborne background from the Parachute regiment.  It is also trained in counter-terrorism, hostage rescue, the clandestine elimination of terrorists/terrorism both within and without the borders of the country,  surgical/precision strikes of very high value targets, HALO/HAHO parachuting, high risk  sensitive missions, direction of air strikes, counter insurgency,long range reconnaissance, special reconnaissance, VIP protection, anti hijacking, blackmail, sabotage, infiltration, kidnapping, direct action, surreptitious entry, psychological warfare, intimidation, counter intelligence, advance security operations, scrounging, assassinations, foreign internal defense, chemical and biological warfare, siege breaking, linguistics, proficiency in small arms, navigation, camouflage, stealth, unarmed combat, close quarter battle amongst others. It is reported that Zim SAS adopted some methods, doctrine and ways of doing things of the Selous Scouts of the Rhodesian Army. They also possess the capability of also training, organising, and advising a host nations para-military and military forces for the sustenance of internal security. When called for, they also possess the capabilities of aiding other Zimbabwe government agencies in the pursuit of strategic national operations. The Zim SAS is the most secretive of all Zimbabwe army units and the government never acknowledges their existence nor is its information readily available. Close links once exited between UK 22 SAS regiment and Zim SAS even cross training together to exchange skills and raise quality. However, since Zimbabwe conducted land reforms and severed good relations with the UK and its allies, the Zim SAS suffered by being excluded from participating in such crucial exchange programs. It remains the only unit in Africa and the only black country officially authorised to wear the distinguishing features of an "SAS operator" and also use the title, "Special Air Service". From their exploits in the Second Congo war, the SAS and commando regiments are forever honored from their professional performance as arguably the greatest ever special forces to ever operate on African soil and for that type of warfare. In the ZNA they are the most respected, mysterious and feared unit. 

 Zimbabwe Mounted Infantry or Grey's Scouts, a horse-mounted reconnaissance unit. The main unit used to be based at Guinea Fowl. The battalion conducts border patrols and anti-poaching operations. The regiment is commanded by Lieutenant Colonel Bothwell Brian Chigaba.
 Boat Squadron with five sub-units:
A Troop, with a strength of 40 men, equipped with a few interceptor craft.
B Troop with assault boats to ferry troops ashore
C Troop, with a large transporter, the Ubique—a 72 tonne landing craft capable of carrying 30 tonnes of men and equipment including armoured cars. Ubique was also armed with 12.7 and 7.62 mm machine guns for self-protection and covering fire purposes.
D Troop, a support group trained for protecting beachheads and making assault landings for non-specialised units, employing mortar and support weapons.
E Troop was deployed for the purposes of guarding the harbours on Lake Kariba and around the rest of the squadron, as required.
There is also a diving school, equipped with a decompression chamber, operated in
conjunction with the commandos.

Operations

Angola
Some sources claim Zimbabwean commandos led the final assault on UNITA leading to the eventual killing of Jonas Savimbi. Zimbabwe sent 2,000 troops to help the Angola government end the war.

Mozambique
Special Forces launched several search and destroy operations against RENAMO guerrillas.

 5–9 December 1984 the Parachute Group and Special Air Service (SAS) spearheaded Operation Lemon.
 20 August 1985 in Operation Grapefruit the Parachute Group and One Command Battalion supported 3 Brigade in taking over the MNR Muxamba base.
 28 August 1985 SAS and Commando Regiment units lead raid on Casa Banana.
 24 January 1986 in Operation Octopus, Paras and Commandos were dropped near Marromeu to secure the town and the sugar refinery. 27 January 1986 several Para drops were made in support of the operation.

Congo
Zimbabwean commandos led by Captain Chrispen Nyachiwowo defended Kinshasa at the last minute when it was on the brink of falling to rebels and invading Ugandan and Rwandan army units. On this last-minute defense of Kinshasa, nothing but professionalism and history was made, registering Zimbabwean commandos to arguably be amongst the world's best as only 24 men from diamond squadron were used for the 24-hour special mission with 20 returning alive reporting mission complete. The mission was very tough as the enemy was just left with but a few hours to declare DRC a colony, Kinshasa being surrounded and overrun by armed rebels until the Zim commandos arrived in enviable style around 12 noon and the following day around 12 noon after heavy fighting and successfully repelling the enemy. Nothing but tactical superiority and better trained special men rendered the mission a success. The names of these deadly commandos are engraved on a roll of honor at the commando barracks in exemplary remembrance to the High standards and excellence demanded of those qualified to wear the tartan green beret and dagger. Due to the river networks in the DRC, the Boat Squadron saw extensive use during the course of Zimbabwe's involvement.

In August 1998, the ZDF had one SAS squadron supporting a battalion of paratroopers defending N’Djili from a Rwandan offensive. The Parachute Regiment suffered a heavy blow when 15 soldiers and their CASA 212 were captured after landing on an airstrip already controlled by the invading forces. It is believed the DRC government army unit they were supposed to join had defected to the rebels.

Zimbabwean SAS ambushed a column of rebel Type-59 tanks close to Kinshasa, knocking out the lead tank and creating panic in the rest of crews that abandoned their tanks and ran away. When the rebels attacked the airport, Zimbabwean SAS and paratroopers remained in possession of the military side of the airport plus the control tower and eventually defeated the offensive.

The battle of Kinshasa was won by the Air force of Zimbabwe, which operated from the section of the airport controlled by ZDF troops. It played a crucial role in the securing of Kinshasa as the ZNA could not move since the rebels were all over the place. It was the jets of 5 squadron, which played a crucial role together with helicopter squadrons of the AFZ who managed to neutralise the rebels by destroying their tanks and heavy artillery.

The AFZ gained much respect as they demonstrated expertise and professionalism throughout the entire war. It was the Zimbabwean airmen who secured the Matadi corridor, Bukavu and the Inga dam with the support of the Zim commandos, SAS, Paras and Amphibious sqn.

For more on past operations please see the Zimbabwe National Army page.

See also
Special forces of Rhodesia

References

External links
 Brief history of ZNA's Mounted Infantry & Parachute Battalion

Military units and formations of Zimbabwe